Antonio Alberto García Guerrero (February 6, 1886November 7, 1959) was a Chilean composer, pianist, and teacher. While he is most famously remembered as the mentor of Canadian pianist Glenn Gould, García influenced several generations of musicians through his many years of teaching at the Toronto Conservatory of Music.

Biography
Born in La Serena, Chile, García first studied piano with his mother and older brother Daniel; he was otherwise self-taught. After the family moved to Santiago in the early 1890s, he became part of a group of artists and intellectuals who called themselves Los Diez. As a resourceful composer and talented concert pianist, García would have a reform-minded influence on Chilean musical life. His brother Eduardo became a music critic and Alberto contributed articles and reviews to the newspaper El diario ilustrado. He published a treatise in 1915 entitled La armonia moderna (now lost).

García introduced Chilean audiences to the modern music of his day, including works by Debussy, Ravel, Cyril Scott, Scriabin, and Schoenberg. He founded and conducted Santiago's first symphony orchestra and was active in founding the Sociedad Bach in 1917.

In 1918, during a honeymoon trip to New York City, García came in contact with members of the Hambourg family, who invited him to teach at the recently established Hambourg Conservatory in Toronto. García accepted this position and emigrated to Canada with his wife and daughter the following year.

In Toronto, García performed for a few years with the Hambourg Trio (having replaced pianist Mark Hambourg). While he shifted his focus to piano technique and pedagogy, he expanded his performing repertory to include works from Purcell through Les Six. As one of Canada's most active pianists, he played regular radio recitals (a highly innovative move at the time) beginning in the mid-1920s and through to the early 1950s. He also initiated a subscription series of solo recitals from 1932-1937. Each season's four or five recitals would cover often neglected works by Bach, Scarlatti, Haydn, Mozart, 18th-century Spanish composers, 20th-century French composers, and Stravinsky. Bach pieces included the complete inventions and sinfonias as well as the Goldberg Variations, all of which would be later popularized by his pupil Glenn Gould. García performed in various chamber ensembles with musicians such as with Frank Blachford (violin), Leo Smith (cello), Harold Sumberg (violin), and Cornelius Ysselstyn (cello). For over a decade, he was also a member of the Five Piano Ensemble.

In 1922, García left the Hambourg Conservatory and joined the Toronto Conservatory of Music (Royal Conservatory of Music), where he remained until his death in Toronto in 1959, having established himself as one of Canada's preeminent music teachers.

García was known to be quiet and focused. His near self-effacement instead gave rise to the most prominent Canadian musicians of the late 20th century. He had a decisive technical and aesthetic influence on Glenn Gould, whom he mentored for 10 years, even though Gould would later claim to be self-taught. García was also known for his keen intellect and eloquence vis-à-vis painting, poetry, and philosophy (Comte, Husserl, Sartre). "He was one of the few musicians from whom a student would get a vista of ideas beyond music," recalls composer R. Murray Schafer, who composed In Memoriam Alberto Guerrero a few months after his teacher's death.

Compositions
García had been known as a versatile composer in Santiago. In addition to a number of chamber works and piano solos, he wrote music for 4 or 5 operettas and zarzuelas (now lost) which were produced in Chile between 1908 and 1915. However, after moving to Canada, García focused more on teaching, though a couple of piano works (Tango and Southern Seas) were published in 1937. He also collaborated with his wife Myrtle Rose Guerrero to co-author The New Approach to the Piano (2 vols., 1935–36).

Students

As a prominent member of the music circles in Santiago and later at the Toronto Conservatory of Music, García influenced generations of students who would go on to shape the musical life of Chile, Canada, and beyond. What follows is an incomplete list:

 William Aide
 John Beckwith
 Joan Bell
 Helmut Blume
 Gwendoly Duchemin
 Ray Dudley
 Jeanette Fujarczuk
 Dorothy Sandler Glick
 Glenn Gould
 Myrtle Rose Guerrero (2nd wife)
 Stuart Hamilton
 Paul Helmer
 Horace Lapp
 Edward Laufer8
 Patricio Pizarro
 Gordana Lazarevich
 Pierrette LePage
 Jean Lyons
 Edward Magee
 Ursula Malkin
 Bruce Mather
 John McIntyre
 Gordon McLean
 Gerald Moore
 Oscar Morawetz
 Laurence Morton
 Arthur Ozolins
 George Ross
 Domingo Santa Cruz Wilson
 R. Murray Schafer
 Oleg Telizyn
 Malcolm Troup
 Neil Van Allen
 Ruth Watson Henderson
 Grace Irene Hunt McDonald
 Gayle Sharlene Brown

Recordings
Glenn Gould: His First Recordings (1947–1952). Video Artists International 1198 (2001).

Notes

Bibliography
  The only book-length biography of Guerrero.
 

Archive collection
An archive collection of Guerrero's manuscripts and papers is located at the University of Toronto Music Library.

External links

 Encyclopedia of Music in Canada article 
 Schafer, R. Murray (2007). Program Notes (PDF).
 Glenn Gould Archives at Library and Archives Canada
 Description of ‘The Music Teacher’, a documentary by filmmaker Patricia Fogliato
 Site dedicated to Beckwith's biography In Search of Alberto Guerrero
 Archival papers held at University of Toronto Music Library

1886 births
1959 deaths
People from La Serena
Chilean emigrants to Canada
Academic staff of The Royal Conservatory of Music
Chilean classical pianists
Canadian classical pianists
Male classical pianists
Piano pedagogues
Musicians from Toronto
Place of death missing
20th-century classical pianists
20th-century Canadian male musicians